

Amazonia bioregion

Tropical and subtropical moist broadleaf forests
Caquetá moist forests (Brazil, Colombia)
Guianan moist forests (Brazil, French Guiana, Guyana, Suriname, Venezuela)
Guianan piedmont and lowland moist forests (Brazil, Venezuela)
Gurupa várzea (Brazil)
Iquitos várzea (Bolivia, Brazil, Peru)
Japurá–Solimões–Negro moist forests (Brazil, Colombia, Venezuela)
Juruá–Purus moist forests (Brazil)
Madeira–Tapajós moist forests (Bolivia, Brazil)
Marajó várzea (Brazil)
Maranhão Babaçu forests (Brazil)
Mato Grosso tropical dry forests (Brazil)
Monte Alegre várzea (Brazil)
Napo moist forests (Colombia, Ecuador, Peru)
Negro–Branco moist forests (Brazil, Colombia, Venezuela)
Paramaribo swamp forests (Guyana, Suriname)
Purus várzea (Brazil)
Purus–Madeira moist forests (Brazil)
Rio Negro campinarana (Brazil, Colombia)
Solimões–Japurá moist forests (Brazil, Colombia, Peru)
Southwest Amazon moist forests (Bolivia, Brazil, Peru)
Tapajós–Xingu moist forests (Brazil)
Tocantins–Araguaia–Maranhão moist forests (Brazil)
Uatuma–Trombetas moist forests (Brazil, Guyana, Suriname)
Ucayali moist forests (Peru)
Xingu–Tocantins–Araguaia moist forests (Brazil)

Tropical and subtropical dry broadleaf forests
Chiquitano dry forests (Bolivia, Brazil)

Tropical and subtropical grasslands, savannas, and shrublands
Beni savanna (Bolivia Brazil, Peru)
Guianan savanna (Brazil, Guyana, Venezuela)

Caribbean bioregion

Tropical and subtropical moist broadleaf forests
Cuban moist forests (Cuba)
Hispaniolan moist forests (Dominican Republic, Haiti)
Jamaican moist forests (Jamaica)
Leeward Islands moist forests (Antigua, British Virgin Islands, Guadeloupe, Montserrat, Nevis, Saint Kitts)
Puerto Rican moist forests (Puerto Rico)
Windward Islands moist forests (Dominica, Grenada, Martinique, Saint Lucia, Saint Vincent and the Grenadines)

Tropical and subtropical dry broadleaf forests
Bahamian dry forests (The Bahamas, Turks and Caicos Islands)
Cayman Islands dry forests (Cayman Islands)
Cuban dry forests (Cuba)
Hispaniolan dry forests (Dominican Republic, Haiti)
Jamaican dry forests (Jamaica)
Lesser Antillean dry forests (Anguilla, Antigua and Barbuda, Grenada, Martinique, Montserrat, Netherlands Antilles, Saint Lucia, Saint Vincent and the Grenadines)
Puerto Rican dry forests (Puerto Rico)

Tropical and subtropical coniferous forests
Bahamian pineyards (The Bahamas, Turks and Caicos Islands)
Cuban pine forests (Cuba)
Hispaniolan pine forests (Dominican Republic, Haiti)

Flooded grasslands and savannas
Cuban wetlands (Cuba)
Enriquillo wetlands (Dominican Republic, Haiti)

Deserts and xeric shrublands
Cayman Islands xeric scrub (Cayman Islands)
Cuban cactus scrub (Cuba)
Leeward Islands xeric scrub (Anguilla, Antigua and Barbuda, British Virgin Islands,  Guadeloupe, Saint Martin, Saint Barthelemy, Saba, US Virgin Islands)
Windward Islands xeric scrub (Barbados, Dominica, Grenada, Martinique, Saint Lucia, Saint Vincent and the Grenadines)

Central America bioregion

Tropical and subtropical moist broadleaf forests
Cocos Island moist forests (Costa Rica)
Costa Rican seasonal moist forests (Costa Rica, Nicaragua)
Isthmian–Atlantic moist forests (Costa Rica, Nicaragua, Panama)
Isthmian–Pacific moist forests (Costa Rica, Panama)
Oaxacan montane forests (Mexico)
Pantanos de Centla (Mexico)
Petén–Veracruz moist forests (Mexico)
Sierra de los Tuxtlas (Mexico)
Sierra Madre de Chiapas moist forests (El Salvador, Guatemala, Mexico)
Talamancan montane forests (Costa Rica, Panama)
Veracruz moist forests (Mexico)
Veracruz montane forests (Mexico)
Yucatán moist forests (Belize, Guatemala, Mexico)

Tropical and subtropical dry broadleaf forests
Bajío dry forests (Mexico)
Balsas dry forests (Mexico)
Central American dry forests (Costa Rica, El Salvador, Guatemala, Honduras, Mexico, Nicaragua)
Chiapas Depression dry forests (Guatemala, Mexico)
Jalisco dry forests (Mexico)
Panamanian dry forests (Panama)
Revillagigedo Islands dry forests (Mexico)
Sierra de la Laguna dry forests (Mexico)
Sinaloan dry forests (Mexico)
Southern Pacific dry forests (Mexico)
Veracruz dry forests (Mexico)
Yucatán dry forests (Mexico)

Tropical and subtropical coniferous forests
Belizian pine forests (Belize)
Central American pine–oak forests (El Salvador, Guatemala, Honduras, Mexico, Nicaragua)
Miskito pine forests (Honduras, Nicaragua)
Sierra de la Laguna pine–oak forests (Mexico)
Sierra Madre de Oaxaca pine–oak forests (Mexico)
Sierra Madre del Sur pine–oak forests (Mexico)
Trans-Mexican Volcanic Belt pine–oak forests (Mexico)

Flooded grasslands and savannas
Central Mexican wetlands (Mexico)

Montane grasslands and shrublands
Talamancan páramo (Costa Rica, Panama)
Zacatonal (Mexico)

Deserts and xeric shrublands
Motagua Valley thornscrub (Guatemala)
San Lucan xeric scrub (Mexico)
Tehuacán Valley matorral (Mexico)

Central Andes

Tropical and subtropical moist broadleaf forests
Bolivian Yungas (Bolivia, Peru)
Peruvian Yungas (Peru)
Southern Andean Yungas (Argentina, Bolivia)

Tropical and subtropical dry broadleaf forests
Bolivian montane dry forests (Bolivia)

Montane grasslands and shrublands
Central Andean dry puna (Argentina, Bolivia, Chile)
Central Andean puna  (Argentina, Bolivia, Peru)
Central Andean wet puna (Bolivia, Peru)
Cordillera Central páramo (Ecuador, Peru)

Mediterranean forests, woodlands, and scrub
Chilean Matorral (Chile)

Deserts and xeric shrublands
Atacama desert  (Chile, Peru)
Sechura desert (Peru)

Eastern South America

Tropical and subtropical moist broadleaf forests
Alto Paraná Atlantic forests (Argentina, Brazil, Paraguay)
Araucaria moist forests (Argentina, Brazil)
Atlantic Coast restingas (Brazil)
Bahia coastal forests (Brazil)
Bahia interior forests (Brazil)
Caatinga enclaves moist forests (Brazil)
Fernando de Noronha-Atol das Rocas moist forests (Brazil)
Northeastern Brazil restingas (Brazil)
Pernambuco coastal forests (Brazil)
Pernambuco interior forests (Brazil)
Serra do Mar coastal forests (Brazil)
Trinidade-Martin Vaz Islands tropical forests (Brazil)

Tropical and subtropical dry broadleaf forests
Atlantic dry forests (Brazil)
Dry Chaco (Argentina, Bolivia, Paraguay)

Flooded grasslands and savannas
Pantanal (Bolivia, Brazil, Paraguay)
Paraná flooded savanna (Argentina)
Southern Cone Mesopotamian savanna (Argentina)

Tropical and subtropical grasslands, savannas, and shrublands
Campos rupestres (Brazil)
Cerrado (Bolivia, Brazil, Paraguay)
Humid Chaco (Argentina, Brazil, Paraguay)

Deserts and xeric shrublands
Caatinga (Brazil)
Saint Peter and Saint Paul rocks (Brazil)

Northern Andes

Tropical and subtropical moist broadleaf forests
Catatumbo moist forests (Venezuela)
Cauca Valley montane forests (Colombia)
Chocó–Darién moist forests (Colombia, Ecuador, Panama)
Cordillera Oriental montane forests (Colombia, Venezuela)
Eastern Panamanian montane forests (Colombia, Panama)
Eastern Cordillera Real montane forests (Colombia, Ecuador, Peru)
Magdalena Valley montane forests (Colombia)
Magdalena–Urabá moist forests (Colombia)
Northwestern Andean montane forests (Colombia, Ecuador)
Santa Marta montane forests (Colombia)
Cordillera de la Costa montane forests (Colombia, Venezuela)
Western Ecuador moist forests (Colombia, Ecuador)

Tropical and subtropical dry broadleaf forests
Apure–Villavicencio dry forests (Venezuela)
Cauca Valley dry forests (Colombia)
Ecuadorian dry forests (Ecuador)
Lara–Falcón dry forests (Venezuela)
Magdalena Valley dry forests (Colombia)
Maracaibo dry forests (Venezuela)
Marañón dry forests (Peru)
Patía Valley dry forests (Colombia)
Sinú Valley dry forests (Colombia)
Tumbes–Piura dry forests (Colombia, Ecuador, Peru)

Flooded grasslands and savannas
Guayaquil flooded grasslands (Ecuador)

Montane grasslands and shrublands
Cordillera de Mérida páramo (Venezuela)
Northern Andean páramo (Colombia, Ecuador)
Santa Marta páramo (Colombia)

Deserts and xeric shrublands
Guajira–Barranquilla xeric scrub (Colombia, Venezuela)
Malpelo Island xeric scrub (Colombia)
Paraguana xeric scrub (Venezuela)

Orinoco bioregion

Tropical and subtropical moist broadleaf forests
Cordillera La Costa montane forests (Venezuela)
Guayanan Highlands moist forests (Brazil, Colombia, Guyana, Suriname, Venezuela)
Orinoco Delta swamp forests (Guyana, Venezuela)
Tepuis (Brazil, Guyana, Suriname, Venezuela)
Trinidad and Tobago moist forests (Trinidad and Tobago)

Tropical and subtropical dry broadleaf forests
Trinidad and Tobago dry forests (Trinidad and Tobago)

Tropical and subtropical grasslands, savannas, and shrublands
Llanos (Colombia, Venezuela)

Flooded grasslands and savannas
Orinoco wetlands (Venezuela)

Deserts and xeric shrublands
Araya and Paria xeric scrub (Venezuela)
Aruba–Curaçao–Bonaire cactus scrub (Aruba, Bonaire, Curaçao)
La Costa xeric shrublands (Venezuela)

Southern South America

Temperate broadleaf and mixed forests
Juan Fernández Islands temperate forests (Chile)
Magellanic subpolar forests  (Argentina, Chile)
San Felix-San Ambrosio Islands temperate forests (Desventuradas Islands) (Chile)
Valdivian temperate rain forests (Argentina, Chile)

Tropical and subtropical grasslands, savannas, and shrublands
Uruguayan savanna (Argentina, Brazil, Uruguay)

Temperate grasslands, savannas, and shrublands
Argentine Espinal (Argentina)
Argentine Monte (Argentina)
Humid Pampa (Argentina)
Patagonian grasslands (Argentina, Chile)
Patagonian steppe (Argentina, Chile)
Semi-arid Pampa (Argentina)

South Florida

Tropical and subtropical moist broadleaf forests
South Florida rocklands (United States)

Flooded grasslands and savannas
Everglades (United States)

Mangrove

Tropical Atlantic

Gulf of Mexico
Alvarado mangroves (Mexico)
Usumacinta mangroves (Mexico)

Yucatán Peninsula
Belizean Coast mangroves (Belize)
Belizean Reef mangroves (Belize)
Petenes mangroves (Mexico)
Ría Lagartos mangroves (Mexico)
Mayan Corridor mangroves (Mexico)

Atlantic Central America
Bocas del Toro–San Bastimentos Island–San Blas mangroves (Costa Rica, Panama)
Mosquitia–Nicaraguan Caribbean Coast mangroves (Costa Rica, Honduras, Nicaragua)
Northern Honduras mangroves (Guatemala, Honduras)
Rio Negro–Rio San Sun mangroves (Costa Rica, Nicaragua)

West Indies
Bahamian mangroves (Bahamas, Turks and Caicos Islands)
Greater Antilles mangroves (Cuba, Dominican Republic, Haiti, Jamaica, Puerto Rico)
Lesser Antilles mangroves (Lesser Antilles)

Continental Caribbean
Coastal Venezuelan mangroves (Venezuela)
Magdalena–Santa Marta mangroves (Colombia)

Amazon-Orinoco-Maranhao
Amapá mangroves (Brazil)
Guianan mangroves (French Guiana, Guyana, Suriname, Venezuela)
Ilha Grande mangroves (Brazil)
Maranhão mangroves (Brazil)
Pará mangroves (Brazil)
Rio Piranhas mangroves (Brazil)
Trinidad mangroves (Trinidad and Tobago)

Northeast Brazil
Bahia mangroves (Brazil)
Rio Piranhas mangroves (Brazil)
Rio São Francisco mangroves (Brazil)

Southeast Brazil
Ilha Grande mangroves (Brazil)

Tropical Eastern Pacific

Sea of Cortez
Marismas Nacionales–San Blas mangroves (Mexico)

Southern Mexico
Mexican South Pacific Coast mangroves (Mexico)

Pacific Central America
Gulf of Fonseca mangroves (El Salvador, Honduras, Nicaragua)
Moist Pacific Coast mangroves (Costa Rica, Panama)
Northern Dry Pacific Coast mangroves (El Salvador, Guatemala)
Southern Dry Pacific Coast mangroves (Costa Rica, Nicaragua)
Tehuantepec–El Manchón mangroves (Mexico)

Pacific South America
Esmeraldas–Pacific Colombia mangroves (Colombia, Ecuador)
Gulf of Guayaquil–Tumbes mangroves (Ecuador, Peru)
Gulf of Panama mangroves (Panama)
Manabí mangroves (Ecuador)
Piura mangroves (Peru)

Galápagos Islands
Galápagos mangroves (Ecuador)

References
 Dinerstein, Eric; David Olson; Douglas J. Graham; et al. (1995). A Conservation Assessment of the Terrestrial Ecoregions of Latin America and the Caribbean. World Bank, Washington, D.C..

See also
Caribbean bioregion

Lists of ecoregions

.

.